is a one-act opera by Hans Werner Henze with a German libretto by Hans-Ulrich Treichel, after the poem by William Shakespeare. The work uses singers and dancers.

It was first performed by the Bavarian State Opera in Munich on 11 January 1997 . The American première was at the Santa Fe Opera in August 2000, staged by Alfred Kirchner, and the same production was used for the Canadian première, which took place in Toronto in 2001 . The Japanese premiere was given in concert form in Tokyo on 11 January 2001 .

Roles

Source:

References

Further reading

Operas by Hans Werner Henze
German-language operas
1997 operas
Operas
Operas based on classical mythology
Operas based on works by William Shakespeare
One-act operas